This is the list of 232 transiting extrasolar planets sorted by orbital periods. All the transiting planets have true masses, radii and most have known inclinations. Radius is determined by how much the star dims during the transit and inclination is determined from Rossiter–McLaughlin effect. True mass is determined by the minimum mass determined from radial velocity observations divided by the sine of inclination.

The first known planet to be discovered with the transit method was OGLE-TR-56b. The first planetary transit observed (by already known exoplanet) was caused by HD 209458 b. The most massive transiting exoplanet is KELT-1b which masses 27.23 MJ (making it a brown dwarf) while the least massive is Kepler-42d which masses less than 0.003 MJ or 0.9 M🜨. The largest exoplanet known is HAT-P-32b which is 2.037 RJ. The smallest exoplanet known is also Kepler-42d which is 0.051 RJ or 0.57 R🜨. The densest transiting exoplanet known is COROT-3b, which has density of 26.4 g/cm3; the diffusest transiting planet known is Kepler-12b, which has density of only 0.111 g/cm3. The longest period of any transiting planets is Kepler-1647b, which takes 1107 days to orbit its (double) stars. The shortest period is Kepler-42c, which takes just 0.45 days to orbit its star

There are 54 members of multi-planet systems.

Yellow rows denote members of a multi-planet system

See also
 Lists of exoplanets

External links and references
 
 

 
Transiting exoplanets